Howard Sandroff (born October 28, 1949 in Chicago, Illinois) is an American composer and music educator.

Sandroff studied at the Chicago Musical College of Roosevelt University and the Massachusetts Institute of Technology. His composition instructors included Robert Lombardo and Ben Johnston. He has received composition and research fellowships and the National Endowment for the Arts, the University of Chicago and the Yamaha Music Foundation. He worked as a conductor and director of Chicago's New Art Ensemble, and is a lecturer in music at the University of Chicago and directs the university's Computer Music Studio. He is also a professor of Audio Arts & Acoustics at Columbia College Chicago.

In June 1996, Pierre Boulez invited Sandroff to attend the dedication of the new IRCAM facility at the Centre Georges Pompidou. His composition Tephillah, for clarinet and computer, was performed at the dedication by Alain Damiens, clarinetist with the Ensemble Intercontemporain. Sandroff has collaborated with clarinetist John Bruce Yeh, performing Boulez's 1985 work for clarinet and electronics, Dialogue de l'ombre double.

Among Sandroff's compositions are works for solo instruments, chamber music ensembles, and orchestra, often incorporating live or recorded electronic music. His works have been performed throughout the world in concerts and festivals such as New Music America, Aspen Music Festival, New Music Chicago, the International Computer Music Conference, the Smithsonian Institution, and the World Saxophone Congress.

Works 
La Joie (The Joy) for clarinet trio, 1996
Chant de femme, for flutes and electronic sounds, 1996
Chorale for saxophone quartet, 1994
Tephilla for clarinet and computer controlled audio processors, 1990
Eulogy for alto saxophone, 1989
Concerto for Electronic Wind Instrument and String Orchestra, 1988
The Bride's Complaint for soprano and computer generated electronics, 1987
Adagio for piano, 1985
Concerto for Piano and Orchestra, 1983
...there is a decided lack of enthusiasm at my end of the leash. for two pianos and electronic sounds on tape, 1981

References

External links 
  at the University of Chicago
 
 
 
 Interview with Howard Sandroff, April 5, 1993

1949 births
Living people
20th-century classical composers
21st-century classical composers
American male classical composers
American classical composers
EMI Classics and Virgin Classics artists
21st-century American composers
20th-century American composers
20th-century American male musicians
21st-century American male musicians